Santosh Chandra Bhattacharyya (30 August 1915 – 14 December 1971) was a senior lecturer of the department of history at the University of Dhaka, who was killed by an Al Badr squad on 14 December 1971.

Early life 
Bhattacharya came from a Bengali Hindu Brahmin family known for the tradition of studying Sanskrit. He was born on 30 August 1915 in the village of Jantrail on other side of the Buriganga opposite to Dhaka. His birthplace is now under Nawabganj Upazila of Dhaka District. Bhattacharya graduated in history with honours from Dhaka University. In 1938, he completed his master's degree in history from Dhaka University.

Career 
In 1938, Bhattacharya started his career as a lecturer of history at the Jagannath College. In 1949, he joined the Dhaka University as lecturer in history. A few years later he was promoted to the position of senior lecturer. Bhattacharya's area of expertise was the Mauryan period of the Indian history, with special expertise on the works of Chanakya.

Assassination 
On 25 March 1971, when the Pakistan Army launched Operation Searchlight in Dhaka, Bhattacharya escaped to his ancestral village in Jantrail. However, he had to join the university under the directive of the army. He refused to leave Bangladesh and take refuge in India. On 14 December 1971, a squad of Al Badr militia abducted him from his Isa Khan residence in Dhaka. His dead body was discovered from Rayer Bazaar killing field.

References 

1915 births
1971 deaths
People from Dhaka
People killed in the Bangladesh Liberation War